Ceroxylon vogelianum,  also known as the Vogels wax palm is a palm native to the Andes from Venezuela south to Peru in humid montane forest, at an elevation of 1900 – 2900 meters.

Description 
Ceroxylon vogelianum is a small to medium-sized palm with a stem of 3–17 meters tall and 12–25 cm in diameter. The crown can have 6 to 18 leaves, most of them almost upright or horizontally arranged. Leaf blades are made of  46–129 leaflets in a rhachis of 38–210 cm long; petiole 15–75 cm long. Male inflorescences around 160 cm long, with about 40 branches; male flowers with 6 stamens, with filaments up to 1.5 mm long and anthers 1.6–2.5 mm long.  Female inflorescences around. 360 cm long with 31–53 branches; female flowers with 6 staminodes and a green pistil of 2–3 mm in diameter. Fruits globose, orange-red when ripe, 1.6–2.0 cm diam. with seeds 1.1–1.6 cm diam.

Distribution and habitat 
This species is present in the Andes from Venezuela to Colombia, Ecuador, and Peru. It occurs in humid montane forest, between 1900–2900 meters of elevation, with sparse individuals.

References 

Trees of Peru
Trees of Ecuador
Trees of Colombia
Trees of Venezuela
vogelianum